João José Pereira de Lyra (17 June 1931 – 12 August 2021) was a Brazilian businessman and politician.

Career
Lyra was a Member of the Federal Senate from 1989 to 1991, and a Member of the Chamber of Deputies from 2003 to 2007, and from 2011 to 2015. His wealth was once estimated at $140 million, making him at one point Brazil's richest Member of Parliament.

He was named in the 2016 Panama Papers leak.

Death
Lyra died from complications of pneumonia and bronchoaspiration in August 2021, following a battle with COVID-19.

References

1931 births
2021 deaths
Brazilian businesspeople
Members of the Federal Senate (Brazil)
Members of the Chamber of Deputies (Brazil) from Alagoas
Politicians from Recife
People named in the Panama Papers
Democratic Social Party politicians
Brazilian Democratic Movement politicians
Social Christian Party (Brazil) politicians
Brazilian Labour Party (current) politicians
Social Democratic Party (Brazil, 2011) politicians
Deaths from the COVID-19 pandemic in Alagoas